The Japanese war fan, or tessen, is a weaponized Japanese hand fan designed for use in warfare. Several types of war fans were used by the samurai class of feudal Japan and each had a different look and purpose.

Description
War fans varied in size, materials, shape, and use. One of the most significant uses was as a signalling device. Signalling fans came in two varieties:
 a folding fan that has wood or metal ribs with lacquered paper attached to the ribs and a metal outer cover
 a solid open fan made from metal and/or wood, very similar to the gunbai used today by sumo referees.

The commander would raise or lower his fan and point in different ways to issue commands to the soldiers, which would then be passed on by other forms of visible and audible signalling.

War fans could also be used as weapons. The art of fighting with war fans is tessenjutsu.

Types

 [[commons:Category:Gunsen fan| were folding fans used by the average warriors to cool themselves off. They were made of wood, bronze, brass or a similar metal for the inner spokes, and often used thin iron or other metals for the outer spokes or cover, making them lightweight but strong. Warriors would hang their fans from a variety of places, most typically from the belt or the breastplate, though the latter often impeded the use of a sword or a bow.
Tessen were folding fans with outer spokes made of heavy plates of iron which were designed to look like normal, harmless folding fans or solid clubs shaped to look like a closed fan. Samurai could take these to places where swords or other overt weapons were not allowed, and some swordsmanship schools included training in the use of the tessen as a weapon. The tessen was also used for fending off knives and darts, as a throwing weapon, and as an aid in swimming.
 Gunbai were large solid open fans that could be solid iron, metal with wooden core, or solid wood, which were carried by high-ranking officers. They were used to ward off arrows, as a sunshade, and to signal to troops.

War fans in history and folklore

One particularly famous legend involving war fans concerns a direct confrontation between Takeda Shingen and Uesugi Kenshin at the fourth battle of Kawanakajima. Kenshin burst into Shingen's command tent on horseback, having broken through his entire army, and attacked; his sword was deflected by Shingen's war fan. It is not clear whether Shingen parried with a tessen, a dansen uchiwa, or some other form of fan. Nevertheless, it was quite rare for commanders to fight directly, and especially for a general to defend himself so effectively when taken so off-guard.

Minamoto no Yoshitsune is said to have defeated the great warrior monk Saitō Musashibō Benkei with a tessen.

Araki Murashige is said to have used a tessen to save his life when the great warlord Oda Nobunaga sought to assassinate him. Araki was invited before Nobunaga, and was stripped of his swords at the entrance to the mansion, as was customary. When he performed the customary bowing at the threshold, Nobunaga intended to have the room's sliding doors slammed shut onto Araki's neck, killing him. However, Araki supposedly placed his tessen in the grooves in the floor, blocking the doors from closing. His tessen saved his life that day.

The Yagyū clan, sword instructors to the Tokugawa shōguns, included tessenjutsu in their martial arts school, the Yagyū Shinkage-ryū.

Gallery

Popular culture
 The Teenage Mutant Ninja Turtles franchise features war fans used by Hisomi on the 2003 version and April O'Neil in the 2012 version.
 In Demon Slayer: Kimetsu no Yaiba, Doma uses sharp fans in combination with his Blood Demon Art.
 Dragonheart: A New Beginning featured a war fan used by Lian, a Chinese princess. 
 Avatar: The Last Airbender features war fans used by Avatar Kyoshi and the Kyoshi Warriors including Suki.
 The Mortal Kombat character Kitana uses war fans as her weapons of choice.
 The Code Lyoko character Yumi utilizes a war fan as her primary weapon in the virtual world of Lyoko, eventually dual wielding fans as well.
 The MCU version of Doctor Strange features a war fan being used by The Ancient One, mentor of the title character.
 A war fan was one of many weapons used by Vandal Savage in the Arrowverse.
 A war fan was used by the Org General Nayzor in Power Rangers Wild Force.
 War fans inspired the Jungle Fans on Power Rangers Jungle Fury and the Sky Fan in Power Rangers Samurai.
 A war fan is used by Yukiko Amagi in Persona 4
 A war fan was used by Qing Ming, the main protagonist on The Yinyang Master and The Yin-Yang Master: Dream of Eternity.

See also
Tessenjutsu
April O'Neil
Vandal Savage
Minamoto no Yoshitsune

References

Sources
Oscar Ratti and Adele Westbrook, Secrets of the Samurai, Edison, NJ: Castle Books (1973).

Military communication in feudal Japan
Clubs and truncheons of Japan
Ventilation fans
Samurai weapons and equipment

sv:Tessen